Langfield is a surname. Notable people with the surname include:

George Langfield (1922–1984), English rugby league footballer
Jamie Langfield (born 1979), Scottish footballer and coach

See also
Langfeld
Lingfield (disambiguation)